The Pandects, better known as the Digest, is a compendium of writings on Roman law.

Pandects (Greek Pandektai, Latin Pandectae) may also refer to:

Pandects of Aaron of Alexandria (7th century)
Pandects of Antiochus of Palestine (7th century)
Pandectae of Yahya ibn Sarafyun (9th century)
Pandects of Nikon of the Black Mountain (11th century)
Pandectae Medicinae of Matthaeus Silvaticus (14th century)
Pandectae, 1548 edition of the Bibliotheca universalis